Events from the year 1258 in Ireland.

Incumbent
Lord: Henry III

Events

Meeting at Caol-Uisce on the Erne (near Belleek, County Fermanagh) between Aodh, son of O’Connor, Tadhg, son of O’Brien and Brian O’Neill, self-styled “King of the kings of Ireland”.
Clane Friary refounded as a house of the Order of Friars Minor Conventual

Births

Deaths
Jordan d'Exeter, Sheriff of Connacht, was slain in battle by Dubhghall mac Ruaidhrí, a Hebridean king who had plundered a merchant ship in Connacht.

References

 
1250s in Ireland
Ireland
Years of the 13th century in Ireland